Cherie Leena Ditcham (born 11 October 1981, in Melbourne, Australia) is an actress and model affiliated with Wilhelmina Models and NTA Talent Agency.  She was co-host of HDNet's travel series Get Out!, seasons 10 and 11 with Lindsay Clubine.  Ditcham won the search for a co-host broadcast during Season 9. Ditcham resides in Los Angeles.

Career
Ditcham has an Australian/Malaysian background with an Australian father with roots in England and a Chinese-Malay mother. Her modelling career began before she graduated from Monash University in 2006 with a degree in marketing and advertising. She has appeared in numerous photo shoots, TV commercials, and fashion shows.

Filmography
 More Than It Is 2010– Charlie
 Lovers 2008– Qiu
 The Dark 2008– Sylvia
 The Storm Awaits 2007– Cafe Patron 2

References

External links 

Cherie Ditcham on Twitter (Private)
IT Model Management
YouTube casting tape
iSpot TV commercials
Blog

Actresses from Melbourne
1981 births
Living people
Monash University alumni
Australian female models
Australian people of English descent
Australian people of Chinese descent
Australian people of Malaysian descent
Australian actresses of Asian descent